Soldiers of the Queen is a song written and composed by Leslie Stuart. The song is often sung and published as "Soldiers of the King" depending on the reigning monarch at the time. The tune was originally composed by Stuart as a march celebrating the opening of the Manchester Ship Canal. The lyrics were added at a later date and the title changed. The song was then interpolated in the musical comedy An Artist's Model (1895).

The song served as the regimental (quick) march of the Queen's Regiment, 1966–1992. In 1992 the Queens Regiment and Royal Hampshires became the Princess of Wales's Royal Regiment who now use the song Soldiers of the Queen as their regimental song (at the end of the song the Regiment then sing "Farmer's boy" to show their links to R Hampshire)  It is also the regimental march of the combined 2nd and 14th Light Horse Regiment, 2nd/14th Light Horse Regiment (Queensland Mounted Infantry); the Women's Royal Australian Army Corps and the Lord Strathcona's Horse (Royal Canadians), the second most senior of Canada's Cavalry Regiments. It was used as the de facto marchpast of the British Army during the Diamond Jubilee Armed Forces Parade and Muster. The song was sung by the public attending a farewell function in Brisbane, Australia, the day before the departure of the 1st contingent QMI, to the Boer War. It was again sung as the contingent left Brisbane on board S.S. Cornwall on 1 November 1899.

It was used as the theme to the film, Breaker Morant.  BBC Radio 4 comedy programme The Harpoon, a show lampooning boys' magazines from Britain's Empire days of the 20th century, also used the piece as its opening theme—which is harshly interrupted mid-stanza by a page-turn.

The song has no connection to "The Soldiers of Our Queen", a quite different song which appears in the Gilbert and Sullivan opera Patience.

Lyrics
Soldiers of the Queen by Leslie Stuart 1898:

1
Britons once did loyally declaim
About the way we rul'd the waves
Ev'ry Briton's song was just the same,
When singing of our soldier braves.
All the world had heard it
wonder'd why we sang,
And some have learn'd the reason why
But we're forgetting it,
And we're letting it
Fade away and gradually die,
Fade away and gradually die.
So when we say that England's master,
Remember who has made her so

1st Refrain
It's the Soldiers of the Queen, my lads
Who've been my lads,
Who're seen my lads,
In the fight for England's glory, lads,
When we've had to show them what we mean:
And when we say we've always won,
And when they ask us how it's done,
We'll proudly point to ev'ry one
  of England's soldiers of the Queen!
It's the Queen!

2
War clouds gather over ev'ry land,
Our flag is threaten'd east and west.
Nations that we've shaken by the hand
Our bold resources try to test
They thought they found us sleeping
thought us unprepar'd,
Because we have our party wars,
But Englishmen unite when they're call'd to fight
The battle for Old England's common cause,
The battle for Old England's common cause.
So when we say that England's master,
Remember who has made her so.

2nd/3rd Refrains

It's the Soldiers of the Queen, my lads,
Who've been my lads,
Who're seen my lads,
In the fight for England's glory, lads,
When we have to show them what we mean:
And when we say we've always won,
And when they ask us how it's done,
We'll proudly point to ev'ry one
Of England's soldiers of the Queen!
It's the Queen!

3
Now we're rous'd we've buckled on our swords,
We've done with diplomatic lingo,
We'll do deeds to follow on our words,
We'll show we're something more than "jingo."
And though Old England's laws do not her sons compel
To military duties do,
We'll play them at their game, and show them all the same,
An Englishman can be a soldier too,
An Englishman can be a soldier too.
So when we say that England's master,
Remember who has made her so.

 Refrain

References

External links

 Sheet music at the Internet Archive retrieved 7/30/2019
 Gramophone recording 1910 Disques Edison Diamond (40184)  retrieved 7/30/2019

 
British military marches
Songs about soldiers
Songs about the military
Princess of Wales's Royal Regiment
Songs written by Leslie Stuart